The Cyclist ( Bicycleran) is a 1987 Iranian sports-drama film written and directed by Mohsen Makhmalbaf, starring Moharram Zaynalzadeh as Abu Ahmed.

Plot
Nasim, a poor Afghan refugee in Pakistan, gives a demonstration in his town's square where he rides his bicycle without stopping for seven days and seven nights, with the aim of raising money for life-saving surgery for his dying wife. In the end, even after seven days, he continues to pedal endlessly, too fatigued to hear his son's and the crowd's pleas to get off his bicycle. One scholar analyses the film as an allegory which parallels the exploitation that Afghan refugees suffer from in Iran and from which they are unable to escape.

Accolades
In 1991 the film won the best narrative film award in the Hawaii International Film Festival.

References

External links
 

1987 films
1980s sports drama films
Films set in Iran
Iranian drama films
1980s Persian-language films
Films directed by Mohsen Makhmalbaf
Cycling films
Films whose director won the Best Directing Crystal Simorgh
1987 drama films
Films whose writer won the Best Screenplay Crystal Simorgh